was a naval theorist and admiral in the Imperial Japanese Navy during the early twentieth century. He was a great-grandfather of Japanese Empress Masako through her mother's lineage.

Biography

Early life and career
Yamaya was the son of a samurai retainer of Nambu Domain in Morioka, Mutsu Province (present day Iwate Prefecture). He graduated from the 12th class of the Imperial Japanese Naval Academy in 1886, ranked 5th out of 19 cadets. As a midshipman, he served on the cruiser  and as navigation officer on the corvette .

During the First Sino-Japanese War, Yamaya was chief navigator on the converted passenger liner Saikyo-maru,  and was present during the Battle of the Yalu on September 17, 1894, when the ship was commanded by the belligerent  Admiral Kabayama Sukenori.
In 1896, Yamaya attended to the Naval War College, and was promoted to lieutenant commander in December 1897. He became an instructor at the Naval Staff College after only one year following his graduation at the invitation of Admiral Sakamoto Toshiatsu. Sakamoto chose Yamaya (along with Akiyama Saneyuki) as part of a "brain trust" and assigned him the task of making a comprehensive survey of methods and developments at the naval colleges of various western powers. Yamaya went on to earn a reputation as a creative tactician, experimenting with new tactics which went beyond western examples.

Yamaya was promoted to commander in September 1899. In October 1903, he received his first command, of the cruiser .

During the Russo-Japanese War, he commanded Akitsushima during the Battle of the Yellow Sea on August 10, 1904. Promoted to captain in January 1905 Yamaya then commanded the cruiser  during the crucial Battle of Tsushima on May 26, 1905. In June, he was appointed chief-of-staff of the IJN 4th Fleet, and in December was chief-of-staff of the IJN 2nd Fleet.

After the war, Yamaya was appointed captain of the cruiser  in January 1907. He was promoted to rear admiral in December 1909. and served as commandant of the Naval Staff College from September 1909 where he expanded on the theories of Admiral Akiyama Saneyuki, and as head of the Personnel Bureau at the Ministry of the Navy from April 1911. Promoted to vice admiral on December 1, 1913, he returned for a second time as commandant of the Naval Staff College.

World War I
In August 1914, Yamaya was assigned to command the South Seas Squadron (consisting of the cruisers ,  and ) upon the outbreak of World War I patrolling for German warships of German East Asia Squadron in the South Pacific from October to December 1914. Under his command, Japanese forces occupied the former German colonies of Yap and the Caroline Islands. He was awarded the Navy Distinguished Service Medal by the United States government for his contributions to the Allied effort in World War I.

Recalled to Japan the following year, Yamaya was appointed Vice Chief of the Imperial Japanese Navy General Staff, where he served until 1918, when he was given command of the 2nd Fleet.

Appointed a full admiral on November 15, 1919, Yamaya succeeded Admiral Yamashita Gentarō as commander in chief of the IJN 1st Fleet, and concurrently, commander in chief of the Combined Fleet until August 1920. He was subsequently commander of the Yokosuka Naval District until he went in the reserves in March 1923.

Yamaya retired in March 1936 and died in 1940.

Decorations
 1895 –  Order of the Sacred Treasure, 6th class 
 1895 –  Order of the Golden Kite, 5th class  
 1904 – Order of the Sacred Treasure, 4th class 
 1914 -  Order of the Sacred Treasure, 2nd class 
 1915 –  Grand Cordon of the Order of the Rising Sun

References

Notes

|-

1866 births
1940 deaths
Imperial Japanese Navy admirals
People of Meiji-period Japan
People from Morioka, Iwate
Japanese military personnel of the First Sino-Japanese War
Japanese military personnel of the Russo-Japanese War
Japanese military personnel of World War I
Grand Cordons of the Order of the Rising Sun
Recipients of the Order of the Sacred Treasure, 2nd class
Recipients of the Order of the Golden Kite
Recipients of the Navy Distinguished Service Medal